Air Exel was a Dutch airline based in Maastricht in the Netherlands, operating scheduled and chartered flights out of Eindhoven Airport and Maastricht Aachen Airport to several domestic and international destinations.

History

The airline was established on 26 April 1991 as Air Exel Commuter on a co-operational base with Dutch national carrier KLM. Scheduled flights were launched on 1 May of the same year. As part of the parent's move to integrate the services of its feeders, the company was renamed to KLM Exel in January 1998. On 6 November 2004, the co-operation with KLM ended, and the airline became Air Exel Netherlands. 
One month later, in December 2004, Air Exel's Chief Executive Officer, Harm Prins, was arrested on charges of fraud, blackmail, and money laundering. The investigation brought to light financial difficulties with Air Exel, which was subsequently shut down on 31 January 2005.

Destinations

Upon closure, Air Exel operated scheduled flights to the following destinations:
France
Nantes - Nantes Atlantique Airport
Paris - Charles de Gaulle Airport
Saint-Étienne - Saint-Étienne–Bouthéon Airport
Strasbourg - Strasbourg International Airport

Italy
Cuneo - Cuneo International Airport
Milan - Milan Malpensa Airport

Netherlands
Amsterdam - Amsterdam Airport Schiphol
Eindhoven - Eindhoven Airport (secondary base)
Maastricht - Maastricht Aachen Airport (main base)

Norway
Kristiansand - Kjevik Airport

United Kingdom
London - London Stansted Airport

Germany
Hamburg - Fuhlsbüttel Airport

Fleet
Over the years, the KLM Exel/Air Exel fleet consisted of the following aircraft types:

References

External links

 Air Exel (Archive)
 Air Exel (Archive) 

Defunct airlines of the Netherlands
Airlines established in 1991
Airlines disestablished in 2005
1991 establishments in the Netherlands
Dutch companies established in 1991
2005 disestablishments in the Netherlands